Puerto Rico Highway 47 (PR-47), also known as Calle De Diego, is an urban road in Río Piedras, Puerto Rico.

Route description
PR-47 begins at PR-3 (Avenida 65 de Infantería) and ends at downtown Río Piedras, in the Paseo De Diego (commercial area in downtown Río Piedras). Among its intersections are the PR-181 (Expreso Trujillo Alto) and PR-27 (Avenida José C. Barbosa).

Major intersections

See also

 List of highways numbered 47

References

External links
 

047
Roads in San Juan, Puerto Rico